The rivière aux Chiens is a tributary of rivière des Mille Îles, flowing on the north shore of the St Lawrence River, in the administrative region of Laurentides, in the southwest of the province of Quebec, in Canada. This river crosses the Regional County Municipality (RCM) of:
Mirabel;
Thérèse-De Blainville Regional County Municipality: cities of Sainte-Thérèse-de-Blainville, Rosemère et Lorraine.

Geography 

The upper part of this river crosses eastwards an agricultural plain between the village of "Saint-Augustin" (Mirabel) and the urban center of Sainte-Thérèse-de-Blainville. The rest of its course runs through Sainte-Thérèse-de-Blainville and Lorraine.

The "Rivière aux Chiens" has its source near the "Blainville Street East" in Mirabel. This source is located at:
  southwest of Highway 15;
  southeast of the terminal of the Mirabel Airport;
  north-west of rivière des Mille Îles;
  west of the confluence of the "rivière aux Chiens".

Course of the river

  to the southeast in Mirabel up to the limit of the city Sainte-Thérèse-de-Blainville;
  eastward up to the bridge of the Highway 15;
  eastward, crossing the urban center of Sainte-Thérèse-de-Blainville, up to the boundary of the city of Rosemère;
  to the northeast, up to the bridge of the Highway 640;
  to the east, up to the limit of Lorraine;
  to the southeast, up to the confluence of the river

Toponymy

The place name "Rivière aux Chiens" reflects the importance that rural families agreed to dogs as pets. On dairy farms, the dog had great help especially for security, movement of herds, hunting and hitch for pulling sleds.

The place name "rivière aux Chiens" was formalized on December 5, 1968, at the Commission de toponymie du Québec.

See also 

 Mirabel, a city
 Sainte-Thérèse-de-Blainville, a city
 Rosemère, a city
 Lorraine, a city
 Rivière des Mille Îles, a stream
 List of rivers of Quebec

References 

Rivers of Laurentides
Mirabel, Quebec
Tributaries of the Saint Lawrence River